Forged: Writing in the Name of God – Why the Bible's Authors Are Not Who We Think They Are is a book by American New Testament scholar Bart D. Ehrman, published in 2011 by HarperCollins.

Arguments and contentions
In antiquity, pseudepigraphy was an accepted practice in which a writer attributed his work to a well-known figure from the past or a teacher who had greatly influenced him. Forged contends that the practice was not in fact accepted and would have been condemned as dishonest by all authorities in antiquity. Ehrman maintains that the more honest term for such falsely attributed writings is "forgery". 

The book posits that between eight and eleven of the twenty-seven books of the Christian New Testament canon were written as forgeries. Ehrman points out numerous inconsistencies he finds within the New Testament that appear to support many of his claims, such as the fact that in Acts 4, the statement is made that both  Peter and  John were illiterate, yet in later years entire books of the Bible were then alleged to have been written by them.

New Testament books identified as forgeries by Ehrman
 First Epistle of Peter
 Second Epistle of Peter
 Second Epistle to the Thessalonians
 First Epistle to Timothy
 Second Epistle to Timothy
 Epistle to Titus
 Epistle to the Ephesians
 Epistle to the Colossians

False attributions
In addition to the books of the New Testament Ehrman identifies as forgeries, he discusses eight originally anonymous New Testament texts that had names of apostles ascribed to them later and are falsely attributed. These are not forgeries since the texts are anonymous but have had false authors ascribed to them by others:

 Gospel of Matthew
 Gospel of Mark
 Gospel of Luke
 Gospel of John
 The Acts of the Apostles
 First Epistle of John
 Second Epistle of John
 Third Epistle of John
 Epistle to the Hebrews

The Epistle of James is not technically a forgery because it does not claim to be specifically by James, the brother of Jesus.  Rather, it claims to be by "James, a servant of God and of the Lord Jesus Christ" (James 1:1).  James, Ehrman notes, was a common name.  Two of Jesus' disciples had that name, as did the brother of Jesus. It may very well have been written by someone named James. However, to the extent that the author gives the impression that they are James, the brother of Jesus, it might be considered a forgery: Ehrman notes that the author doesn't specify which James he is, meaning "that he is claiming to be the most famous James of all, Jesus's brother."

Reviews 
The book was positively reviewed by the Library Journal.

United Methodist pastor and biblical scholar Ben Witherington III (Asbury Theological Seminary) wrote a long and detailed critique of Ehrman's positions in his blog. Presbyterian pastor and biblical scholar Michael J. Kruger (Reformed Theological Seminary) also wrote a detailed critique of Ehrman's book in the website of The Gospel Coalition.

See also
 Jesus, Interrupted, another New York Times bestseller by Ehrman
 Misquoting Jesus, a New York Times bestseller by Ehrman

References 

2011 in Christianity
2011 non-fiction books
Biblical criticism
Books by Bart D. Ehrman
English-language books
HarperCollins books
Pseudepigraphy